Tailent is a software company for robotic process automation (RPA) founded in Romania by Mario Popescu and Cristian Oftez, headquartered in Bucharest. The company’s software provides a digital workforce especially designed to automate complex, repetitive tasks. Tailent was also mentioned among the 40 startups selected for Startup Spotlight Online 2020.

History 
Tailent was founded in 2015 in Bucharest, Romania as Mission Critical, by Mario Popescu and Cristian Oftez.
In 2020, the name changed to Tailent, once with the launch of Tailent Automation Platform (TAP), and with entering the international market.

Products 
Tailent develops software that is used to automate repetitive tasks, normally performed by people.
The technology combines how humans read the computer displays with prebuilt components that can be combined to automate specific processes. This type of software can be used to automate any tasks performed by other business software such as CRM or ERP, or it can be used to simplify front office repetitive tasks.

Tailent’s main product is Tailent Automation Platform (TAP). It combines a low-code Integrated  Development Environment (IDE) called Studio, used for process creation with agents called Robots to execute the processes. Everything is managed and monitored in a management tool called Orchestrator.

References

External links 

 

Business software companies
Automation software
AI companies
Companies based in Bucharest
Software companies of Romania